was a late-night daily Japanese edutainment TV program featuring Hello! Project members as teacher and students. It aired on TV Tokyo from October 6, 2008, until March 27, 2009, on weekdays, with a running time of about 7 minutes. This show was a replacement for the show "Berikyū".

Yorosen showcased the 3 main groups of Hello! Project: Morning Musume, Berryz Kobo, and Cute. Each episode ended with a segment by Erina Mano.

Concept 
Each week, one Hello! Project member would become the teacher to the other members of her group, often dressing in outfits related to the subject matter they were teaching. The subject matter ranged from world leaders to cute animals and everything in between. In Hello! Project TV tradition, shows relating to food often had the teacher or special student eating the food in question as the fellow members were forced to watch.

Segments 

There was also a segment where Mai Hagiwara teaches English, but it was probably never aired. The segment appears in the Yorosen! DVD Vol. 07.

Controversy 
On December 4, 2008, an episode featuring Cute aired that caused controversy. The show featured a discussion of Adolf Hitler in a segment called "The world's great people!" in which Hitler was casually called "Uncle Hitler" by Cute's members, who were also seen to do imitations of him and draw pictures of him. This forced both TV Tokyo and production company SSM to issue apologies. TV Tokyo issued a statement saying the show contained "Improper contents based on an insufficient knowledge of history." SSM issued a statement stating "The check system inside our company was lacking" and a "promise to be more careful in preventing a similar incident from happening again in the future". Soon after, it was announced that Yorosen! was to end, and that SSM would be ending their relationship with Hello! Project, believed to be over the "Hitler incident".

References

Hello! Project
TV Tokyo original programming
2008 Japanese television series debuts
2009 Japanese television series endings
Television controversies in Japan